Hacıağabəyli (also, Hacağabəyli, Gadzhiagabeyli, and Gadzhyagabeyli) is a village in the Goychay Rayon of Azerbaijan. The village forms part of the municipality of Yeniarx.

References 

Populated places in Goychay District